His Mother is a 1912 American silent film produced by Kalem Company. It was directed by Sidney Olcott with Gene Gauntier and Jack J. Clark in the leading roles.  It was one of more than a dozen films produced by the Kalem Company filmed in Ireland for American audiences.

Plot
Terence, a violin player living in the Irish country side with his mother, is overheard by a group of passing Americans, including the banker John Foster who recognizes him as a musical genius and asks him to come to New York. After a few months, Terence's mother gives him her life savings to book passage for him to travel to America. He becomes a success, but rarely thinks of his mother. Pining for her son, his mother receives help from a parish priest and is able to follow him to New York. After seeing him in concert at the opera house, a stagehand guides her to Terence's house, where a butler refuses to let them in. When Terence learns of his mother, he rushes from his dinner with his friends and tearfully embraces her. He presents her to his friends, where they drink a toast to her.

Cast
 Jack J. Clark - Terence
 Anna Clark - Terence's Mother
 Gene Gauntier - John Foster's Daughter
 J.P. McGowan - John Foster
 Robert G. Vignola - The Priest
 Alice Hollister
 Arthur Donaldson

Production notes
The film was shot in Beaufort, County Kerry, Ireland, and in New York, during the summer of 1911, with interior shots filmed in New York.

Anna Clark is real Jack J. Clark's mother.

References

Further reading
 Michel Derrien, Aux origines du cinéma irlandais: Sidney Olcott, le premier oeil, TIR 2013.

External links

 His Mother website dedicated to Sidney Olcott
Restored film by Trinity College, Dublin at YouTube

1912 films
Silent American drama films
American silent short films
Films set in Ireland
Films shot in Ireland
Films directed by Sidney Olcott
Kalem Company films
1912 short films
1912 drama films
American black-and-white films
1910s American films